Pacific Western Airlines Flight 501 was a regularly scheduled flight from Calgary to Edmonton, Alberta, Canada. The aircraft caught fire during takeoff on March 22, 1984. All 119 passengers and crew members survived, but five people suffered serious injuries while 22 others suffered minor injuries.

Accident description
The Boeing 737, registered C-GQPW, taxied from the gate at Calgary International Airport at 7:35 AM and proceeded to take off on runway 34, carrying five crew members and 114 passengers.  At 7:42 AM, a loud popping sound was heard 20 seconds into the takeoff run.  The aircraft began to vibrate and veer to the left, and a fire broke out in the rear of the aircraft.  The pilot, Stan Fleming, managed to abort the take-off.

An emergency evacuation was ordered as the fire spread throughout the aircraft.  Five people were seriously injured and 22 suffered minor injuries, but no one was killed.  The aircraft was destroyed by the fire.

The Canadian Aviation Safety Board (CASB) determined that an uncontained failure of the left engine thirteenth stage compressor disc had occurred. Debris from the engine punctured a fuel cell, resulting in the fire. The disc failure was the result of fatigue cracking. The fire was attributed to a faulty compressor disc that blew apart, rupturing the fuel tanks. This incident was similar to the cause of the British Airtours Flight 28M disaster that claimed 55 lives in 1985.

References

External links
 Final accident report (Archive)

1984 in Canada
Airliner accidents and incidents in Canada
Aviation accidents and incidents in 1984
Accidents and incidents involving the Boeing 737 Original
Pacific Western Airlines accidents and incidents
Airliner accidents and incidents caused by in-flight fires
1984 in Alberta
March 1984 events in Canada
Airliner accidents and incidents involving uncontained engine failure
Calgary International Airport